"Don't Come Home A-Drinkin' (With Lovin' on Your Mind)" is a country music song, made famous by singer Loretta Lynn in early 1967. The song was Loretta Lynn's first number-one country hit.  It is one of her best known songs and is included in all of her live shows.  It was only the seventh solo female vocalist record to hit that position up to that time (the others being by Goldie Hill, Connie Smith, and two each by Kitty Wells and Patsy Cline) as well as the first written by the woman herself (the song being co-written by Loretta and her sister Peggy Sue).  The background vocalists on the recording are the Jordanaires.

About the song
One of Loretta Lynn's best-known compositions, "Don't Come Home A-Drinkin" is about an angry wife who is fed up with her husband coming home late every night very drunk and wanting to have sex. The song was based on Lynn's personal life; her husband is known to have been a heavy drinker.  The song was the first of many controversial songs sung by Lynn, which also included 1972's "Rated X" and 1975's "The Pill". The song was considered very controversial for the time, but was ultimately quite popular.  An album of the same name was released following the song's success, which also rose to the top of the charts.

Released in late 1966, "Don't Come Home A-Drinkin'" didn't reach the top spot until February 11, 1967, overtaking Jack Greene's No. 1 hit from late 1966, "There Goes My Everything". The song was the first of 16 No. 1 Country hits Lynn would have over the course of her career.  The song set the standard for Lynn's biggest success to come in the early 1970s. Thanks in part to the success of this hit, Lynn became the first female Country entertainer to win the CMA Awards' "Female Vocalist of the Year" award in late 1967.

In 1970 "Don't Come Home A-Drinkin" was certified by the RIAA as a gold album making Loretta Lynn the first woman in country music to receive such an honor.

In 2003, "Don't Come Home A-Drinkin'" placed at No. 47 on CMT's 100 Greatest Songs in Country Music.

Chart performance

Cover versions
 One year later, following Lynn's success with the song, Lynn's brother, Jay Lee Webb recorded an answer song to "Don't Come Home A-Drinkin'" titled, "I Come Home A-Drinkin' (To a Worn Out Wife Like You)". Her brother's version of the song charted the Country charts that year.
 Tammy Wynette recorded a version for her late 60s album, Your Good Girl's Gonna Go Bad.
 Gretchen Wilson recorded a version as part of the album Coal Miner's Daughter: A Tribute to Loretta Lynn.

References

1967 singles
Loretta Lynn songs
Tammy Wynette songs
Gretchen Wilson songs
Song recordings produced by Owen Bradley
Songs written by Loretta Lynn
Decca Records singles
1966 songs
Songs about alcohol